Scalenus is an Old World genus of round-necked longhorn beetles of the subfamily Cerambycinae.

Species
Scalenus auricomus (Ritsema, 1890)
Scalenus borneensis Bentanachs & Drouin, 2014
Scalenus cingalensis (White, 1855)
Scalenus fasciatipennis (Waterhouse, 1885)
Scalenus fulvus (Bates, 1879)
Scalenus hefferni Bentanachs & Jiroux, 2018
Scalenus hemipterus (Olivier, 1795)
Scalenus kalimantanensis Bentanachs & Jiroux, 2018
Scalenus pejchai Bentanachs & Jiroux, 2018
Scalenus philippensis Bentanachs & Drouin, 2014
Scalenus sericeus (Saunders, 1853)
Scalenus skalei Bentanachs & Jiroux, 2018
Scalenus ysmaeli Hüdepohl, 1987

References

Callichromatini